Esteban Chul Woo Um Lee (born 23 June 1999), is a Bolivian footballer of South Korean descent  who plays as a midfielder for Club Real Potosí.

Career statistics

Club

Notes

References

1999 births
Living people
Bolivian footballers
Bolivian people of South Korean descent
South Korean footballers
Association football midfielders
Bolivian Primera División players
Club Bolívar players
Club Real Potosí players